The Nokia Lumia 930 (codenamed Martini) is a high-end smartphone developed by Nokia that shipped with Microsoft's Windows Phone 8.1 operating system. It was announced on April 2, 2014 at Microsoft Build 2014 and was released in April 2014 as Nokia's (and later Microsoft Mobile's) flagship. It is the last high-end Nokia-branded Lumia device and succeeded by the Microsoft-branded Lumia 950 and its XL equivalent.

The Nokia Lumia Icon, which is exclusive to Verizon Wireless in the United States, is essentially a derivative of the Lumia 930. The two versions share a common design and specifications; the only hardware difference is that the 930 is equipped with GSM radios and available as both carrier-locked and unlocked versions, while the Icon has both GSM and CDMA radios and is always sold unlocked. The other difference is that the 930 was originally pre-loaded with the newer Windows Phone 8.1 rather than the previous-generation Windows Phone 8 Update 3 on the Icon.

Neither the 930 nor the Icon have the Glance feature, which displays the time and other selectable information on the display of an otherwise sleeping phone. While other contemporary Nokia smartphones have Glance, the 930 and Icon do not because their displays lack the necessary "display memory" feature.

Specifications

Hardware 

The Lumia 930 has a 5.0-inch AMOLED display, quad-core 2.2 GHz Krait 400 Qualcomm Snapdragon 800 processor, 2 GB of RAM and 32 GB of internal storage. The phone has a 2420 mAh Li-Ion battery, 20 MP rear camera and 1.2 MP front-facing camera. It is available in orange, green, white, black and gold.

Software 

The Lumia 930 ships with Windows Phone 8.1, though users can upgrade to Windows 10 Mobile if their provider allows it.

Known issues 

Some handsets experience heat and battery drain issues.

Some handsets have had a display discoloration issue, when the device came out.

A significant number of Lumia 930 users have reported an issue with the operation of the audio microphones, where handsfree calls and video recordings have very low audio levels. This has been confirmed to be caused by a motherboard fault. There have been a number of reports of this being a software issue introduced with Windows 10, though this is incorrect as the issue is also reported with Windows 8.1, including pre-Denim releases. A workaround for Lumia 930 users experiencing this issue is to use ear buds that have a microphone included when doing handsfree calls and video recordings.
Microsoft provides LumiaPhoneTestApplicationInstaller.exe, with which every microphone can be tested for its own.

Gallery

See also 
 Microsoft Lumia
 Nokia Lumia Icon

External links 
 Nokia Lumia 930
 Nokia Lumia 930 specifications

References 

Mobile phones introduced in 2014
Discontinued smartphones
Microsoft Lumia
Videotelephony
Nokia smartphones
Windows Phone devices
Microsoft hardware

PureView